Red Hill  ( Karmir Blur) is an Armenian drama television series, which premiered on ATV on January 8, 2018 and airs every workday at 11:00 (PM).

Most of the series took place in Surenavan village of Armenia.

Cast and characters

Main Cast
Anet Harutyunyan
Tiruhi Hakobyan
Luiza Melkonyan
Susanna Baghdasaryan
Vardan Hovsepyan
Samvel Sargsyan
Artashes Aleksanyan
Sargis Grigoryan
Ruzan Mesropyan
Vahe Ziroyan
Julieta Sagatelian

References

Armenian-language television shows
Armenian drama television series
2010s Armenian television series
ATV (Armenia) original programming
2018 Armenian television series debuts